Harry White may refer to:

Politics
Harry White (Australian politician) (1898–1946), Australian politician from Victoria
Harry White (Pennsylvania politician) (1834–1920), American politician from Pennsylvania
Harry White (Washington politician) (1859–1940), American politician, mayor of Seattle
Harry Keith White (born 1943), American politician from West Virginia
Harry Oliver White (1895–1987), Canadian politician

Music
Harry White (musicologist) (born 1958), Irish musicologist
Harry White (saxophonist) (born 1967), American-born classical saxophonist
Harry White (trombonist) (1898–1962), American jazz trombonist

Sports
Harry White (cricketer, born 1897) (1897–1978), English cricketer
Harry White (cricketer, born 1995), English cricketer
Harry White (footballer, born 1901) (1901–1983), English footballer
Harry White (footballer, born 1994) (born 1994), English footballer
Harry White (jockey) (1944–2022), Australian jockey

Others
Harry White (Irish republican) (1916–1989), Chief of Staff of the IRA
Harry Dexter White (1892–1948), American economist
Harry Vere White (1837–1941), Irish Anglican cleric

See also
Henry White (disambiguation)
Harold White (disambiguation)
Harrison White (disambiguation)
Harry Whyte, see LGBT history in Russia